North American area code 325 is a state of Texas area code for telephone numbers in the Abilene and San Angelo areas.  It was created, along with area code 432, on April 5, 2003, in a split from area code 915.

Counties served by this area code:

 Brown
 Callahan
 Coke
 Coleman
 Comanche
 Concho
 Crockett
 Fisher
 Irion
 Jones
 Kimble
 Llano
 Mason
 McCulloch
 Menard
 Mills
 Mitchell
 Nolan
 Reagan
 Runnels
 San Saba
 Schleicher
 Scurry
 Shackelford
 Sterling
 Sutton
 Tom Green
 Taylor

Cities and towns served by this area code:

 Abilene
 Albany
 Anson
 Avoca
 Baird
 Ballinger
 Bangs
 Barnhart
 Big Lake
 Blackwell
 Blanket
 Brady
 Bronte
 Brookesmith
 Brownwood
 Buffalo Gap
 Burkett
 Carlsbad
 Cherokee
 Christoval
 Clyde
 Coleman
 Colorado City
 Comanche
 Doole
 Dyess Air Force Base
 Early
 Eden
 Eldorado
 Eola
 Fredonia
 Goldsboro
 Goldthwaite
 Goodfellow Air Force Base
 Gouldbusk
 Gustine
 Hamlin
 Hawley
 Hermleigh
 Ira
 Junction
 Kingsland
 Lawn
 Llano
 Lohn
 London
 Loraine
 Lueders
 Maryneal
 Mason
 Mc Caulley
 Melvin
 Menard
 Mereta
 Merkel
 Mertzon
 Miles
 Millersview
 Moran
 Mullin
 Nolan
 Norton
 Ovalo
 Ozona
 Paint Rock
 Pontotoc
 Priddy
 Putnam
 Richland Springs
 Robert Lee
 Roby
 Rochelle
 Rockwood
 Roosevelt
 Roscoe
 Rotan
 Rowena
 San Angelo
 San Saba
 Santa Anna
 Snyder
 Sonora
 Stamford
 Sterling City
 Sweetwater
 Sylvester
 Tennyson
 Tow
 Trent
 Tuscola
 Tye
 Valera
 Veribest
 Voca
 Wall
 Water Valley
 Westbrook
 Wingate
 Winters
 Zephyr

See also
List of Texas area codes

External links

List of exchanges from AreaCodeDownload.com, 325 Area Code

Telecommunications-related introductions in 2003
325
325
Taylor County, Texas